Dr. Meleeka Clary, born October 14, 1973, is an American clinical psychologist, paralegal, model, actor, and director.

Early life and education 
Clary was born on October 14, 1973, in Boston, Massachusetts, to Andrew Lee Clary and Larriana Clary. At age 8, she was enrolled in Vicki's School of Dancing and Acting.

In 2000, she received her bachelor's degree in Criminal Justice, followed by a master's degree in Criminal Justice from Curry University in 2004. In the following year, she received a paralegal certificate from Northeastern University. Clary completed her PhD in clinical psychology at Walden University in 2021.

Career 
Clary began in 1998 as an office manager at Alternative Solutions. After obtaining her bachelor's degree, Clary joined Hilderbrand Shelter as a counselor for domestic violence, drug addicts, and HIV patients. In addition, she has also worked as a counselor for other institutes, including Inn Transition Shelter and Meaningful Days Services.

In 2005, Clary became an instructor at Premier Education Group (Salter School), where she educated career students pursuing higher education levels in the medical field. Clary has also been an instructor at Lincoln Tech Career Institute, ITT Tech Institute, and IVY Tech Institute. As of September 2022, Clary was a clinical psychologist at HMWP Psychology Counseling. She consults with mentally-disabled clients.

Entertainment career 

In 2021, Clary made her directorial debut with Three Corners of Deception, an autobiographical film following a divorce and custody battle. Clary won several accolades and awards for the film including Best Human Rights Director at the Toronto International Women Film Festival, Best Female Director at Toronto International Women Film Festival, Best Female Director at San Francisco Indie Short Festival, Best Female Director winner at the Toronto International Women Film Festival, Best Actress at Festival Award at Global Film Festival LA, and director honors at the Red River Film Festival. The film was also screened at Berlin International Art Film Festival, Best Feature Film at Paris International Women Festival, Festival Award at Medusa Film Festival, Indian Indie Award, and Festival Award at Global Film Festival LA.

Clary has modeled for several brands, shows, and companies, including Next Entertainment, Dynasty Inc, Denise White, and Dominique Fashion Design. In 2016, Clary acted in Dr. Bird's Advice for Sad Poets as Kwame's Mother. In addition, she has also acted in Eclipse: The Rise of Ink, Nashville, Greenleaf, The Resident, and Bittersweet.

Personal life 
Clary is a mother to three children, and volunteers for several organizations, including Fuller Carter Hospital for the mentally ill, a student assistant at Newbury College, and as a mentor for Wipeout Drug Abuse for Teens (W.O.D.A).

References

External links 
 

1973 births

Living people
People from Boston
American artists
American film directors

American psychologists